Williamson Peninsula is an ice-covered peninsula midway along the south side of Thurston Island. It extends southwest into Abbot Ice Shelf between Schwartz Cove and O'Dowd Cove. Named by Advisory Committee on Antarctic Names (US-ACAN) after Lieutenant Commander H. E. Williamson, Medical Officer of the seaplane tender Pine Island in the Eastern Group of U.S. Navy Operation Highjump, 1946–47.

Maps
 Thurston Island – Jones Mountains. 1:500000 Antarctica Sketch Map. US Geological Survey, 1967.
 Antarctic Digital Database (ADD). Scale 1:250000 topographic map of Antarctica. Scientific Committee on Antarctic Research (SCAR). Since 1993, regularly upgraded and updated.

Peninsulas of Ellsworth Land